In the Book of Mormon, Coriantumr is the name of three figures that appear throughout the book's narrative. Chronologically, they are one of the sons of Omer, a deposed Jaredite king who was later restored to his throne by his sons Esrom and Coriantumr; the last of the Jaredite kings, who lived to see his people destroyed and to see another people, the Mulekites, live in the land; and a Nephite dissenter, who was made leader by the Lamanites over the Lamanite armies. Coriantumr is also the name of an oratorio written by composer Rowan Taylor.

Coriantumr (son of Omer)

The first Coriantumr (chronologically) was one of the sons of Omer. Omer had been deposed from his throne by his son Jared, who kept him imprisoned. Esrom and Coriantumr had been born while their father was held as a prisoner by Jared. Coriantumr and Esrom restored their father as the king of the Jaredites twice. (See Omer (Book of Mormon) for more details.)

Coriantumr (king)

Coriantumr was one of the last Jaredites, as well as one of their last kings. In his reign, Ether came under the direction of God to prophesy to the people, and could not be restrained. Accordingly, his prophecies were great and marvelous, and nobody believed because "they saw them not." Eventually, he was cast out, the prophecy of their destruction was given, and Ether remained in a cave, recording the events.

Accordingly, Coriantumr was troubled in the same year Ether was cast out with a great war among the people. Many rose up who were mighty men and sought to destroy him, "by their secret plans of wickedness." However, Coriantumr, being well-studied in war and other cunning learning, gave battle unto them. Neither he nor his house repented; neither did the house of Cohor and Corihor. The war took a turn for the bloodiest, and the king was wounded. Ether came to him and told him that the Lord would spare him and his household if they would repent; otherwise, they would be destroyed and another people would inherit the land and Coriantumr would be the last survivor to see them inherit the land.

Coriantumr refused to repent and tried to kill Ether, who escaped. Then came Shared, who defeated the king and took him captive. But his sons rescued him and reobtained the kingdom. Still, there was great wickedness and robbery in the land. Afterward, the king fighting with Shared in wrath through the valley of Gilgal, then to the plains of Heshlon and back to the Valley of Gilgal, where Shared was slain. In the battle, Shared had wounded Coriantumr in the thigh and he did not go to battle for two years, leaving the people to war unrestrained.

The land then became cursed so badly that everything had to be kept on one's person or it would be taken. Therefore, every man sought to protect what was his. Then, Coriantumr fought with the brother of Shared, whose name was Gilead. Gilead was beaten and chased to the wilderness of Akish, where the battle was very horrid, with many thousands falling by the sword.

Gilead then rushed to the Land of Moron in the night while Coriantumr's army was drunk; slaying many. He then sat on Coriantumr's throne for two years, while Coriantumr gathered strength in the wilderness.

Gilead was slain by his high priest upon the throne. Lib (first referred to as a secret combination) then murdered the high priest in a secret pass and obtained the kingdom. Coriantumr came back and gave battle to Lib. Lib hurt Coriantumr's arm but that didn't stop Coriantumr. Lib fled to the borders of the seashore, where they fought again.

Lib fled to the wilderness of Akish then to the plains of Agosh. Coriantumr followed with all the people. Coriantumr then slew Lib but the brother of Lib, Shiz, took up the cause, killing man, woman, and child. The smell of the dead bodies was horrid and it troubled the people. Shiz did not stop and swore to avenge his brother. But according to Ether's words Coriantumr did not fall.

Shiz pursued him eastward to the seashore and fought for the space of three days. The destruction of Shiz's armies was so great that the people began to flee before the armies. People joined one or the other's armies as they felt they would die.

After many battles with Shiz on hilltops and such and after many close calls, Coriantumr wished to end the fighting. All the people were engaged in the battles. Coriantumr began to repent of his sins and sent an epistle to Shiz asking for him to stop the war for the people's sake. Shiz asked for the head of Coriantumr. His army would not allow that. They were drunken with anger and slept upon their swords. The numbers dwindled down until only Shiz and Coriantumr were left. They fought until Shiz fainted for of loss of blood and Coriantumr smote off his head. Coriantumr then wandered off to be found later by the Mulekites (people of Zarahemla), and lived with them nine months until his death.

Coriantumr (dissenter)
Coriantumr is also the name of a Nephite dissenter who the Lamanites king made leader over the Lamanite armies. Coriantumr led them into battle against the Nephites in approximately 50 B.C.  The origins of Coriantumr are described in Chapter one of the book of Helaman as a descendant of Zarahemla, the founder of the city of Zarahemla and leader of the Mulekites at the time Mosiah I had found them.
In about 51 to 50 B.C. Tubaloth, son of the Nephite apostate king Ammoron (who became king of the Lamanites after his brother, Amalickiah had died). He stirred up the people of the Lamanites to war against the Nephites after the recent upheaval over the judgement seat between the sons of Pahoran.

He appointed Coriantumr over his armies, supposing that because of his great wisdom and strength, he would gain victory over the Nephites. He is described as large in stature.

Coriantumr came with such speed and numerous hosts, that the Nephites were left totally unprepared. He cut down the watch at the entrance of the city and marched with his whole army into the city slaying all who did oppose them. Pacumeni seeing this did flee to the walls and Coriantumr pursued and slew him against the walls. Now, after seeing the Nephites flee and be slain, Coriantumr became courageous in his heart and went out to march against the whole land, for he had the capital which was the stronghold of the land. He then marched towards the city of Bountiful, so he could have the northern lands taken with the sword. He then supposed that the Nephites' strength was in the center of the land and marched straight up it. Now this tactic had given advantage to the Nephite commander Moronihah even though a lot of the Nephites had been slain in the surprise attack, for they had no idea that the Lamanite would come up the center of the land and would go about securing the border cities which they had gathered to defend. Therefore, the Nephite army was not even in the middle of the land and they then surrounded the Lamanites. (Though before they had surrounded them, the Lamanites had taken many cities and slain many people.) Moronihah did this by sending Lehi, the Nephite commander to head them off with his armies before they got to Bountiful, all the while he was coming up behind. Lehi then routed them from Bountiful and Coriantumr's armies were about to flee back to Zarahemla, where they were met by Moronihah and thus a bloody battle ensued, in which the Lamanites could neither flee south, north, east or west. Seeing that they could not retreat the Lamanites surrendered after Coriantumr had spurred them into the Nephite armies, which got him killed.

Moronihah then took back Zarahemla and then sent the Lamanite prisoners home in peace.

References

Book of Mormon people